The Lena Pillars (Ölüöne Turūk Khayalara) are a natural rock formation along the banks of the Lena River in far eastern Siberia. The highest density of pillars is reached between the villages of Petrovskoye and Tit-Ary. The Lena Pillars Nature Park was inscribed on the World Heritage List in 2012.

Tourism 
One may plan a river cruise by contacting a travel service in the city of Yakutsk.

Few modern amenities exist in this part of Russia, unless one travels by cruise ship on the Lena River. Tit-Ary on the other side of the river has a gravel road from Yakutsk.

Hiking trails in the region are steep and at times precarious.

Geology 
The pillars consist of alternating layers of limestone, marlstone, dolomite and slate of early to middle Cambrian age, which are weathered, producing the rugged outcrops.

These types of rocks are commonly formed in marine environments and the horizontal layering and vertical variation indicates marine transgression/regression; with the slate representing the deep marine, slightly metamorphosed shales.

Climate

The climate is acutely continental with temperatures reaching as low as -60 °C in winter and as high as +35 °C in summer.

See also 
 Krasnoyarsk Pillars
 Lena Cheeks
 Lena Plateau

References

External links

Legends of the mysterious mountains of Yakutia 
По самой большой реке России. Июль. 2017. Фотоотчет. 

Lena River
Geography of the Sakha Republic
Protected areas of the Russian Far East
Cambrian Asia
Geology of Russia
Tourist attractions in the Sakha Republic
World Heritage Sites in Russia